Roger de Saxenhurst was Archdeacon of Leicester from 1275 to 1294: he was also Prebendary of St Margaret, Leicester in Lincoln Cathedral.

Notes

See also
 Diocese of Lincoln
 Diocese of Peterborough
 Diocese of Leicester
 Archdeacon of Leicester

Archdeacons of Leicester
13th-century English people
Lincoln Cathedral